Heinrich Gretler (1897–1977) was a Swiss film and television actor, who also starred on stage at the Bernhard-Theater in Zurich.

Selected filmography

 The Mysterious Mirror (1928)
 Struggle for the Matterhorn (1928)
 The Man with the Frog (1929)
 The Last Company (1930)
 Berlin-Alexanderplatz (1931)
 Inquest (1931)
 Five from the Jazz Band (1932)
 The Empress and I (1933)
 Fusilier Wipf (1938)
 Constable Studer (1939)
 Gilberte de Courgenay (1942)
 Madness Rules (1947)
 White Gold (1949)
 Chased by the Devil (1950)
 The White Hell of Pitz Palu (1950)
 The Last Shot (1951)
 Captive Soul (1952)
 The Great Temptation (1952)
 The Exchange (1952)
 No Greater Love (1952)
 Heidi (1952)
 Nights on the Road (1952)
 The Devil Makes Three (1952)
 Your Heart Is My Homeland (1953)
 Young Heart Full of Love (1953)
 Life Begins at Seventeen (1953)
 The Village Under the Sky (1953)
 Rose-Girl Resli (1954)
 Uli the Farmhand (1954)
 The Mountains Between Us (1956)
 Spring Song (1954)
  The Fisherman from Heiligensee (1955)
 Love's Carnival (1955)
 The Priest from Kirchfeld (1955)
 Heidi and Peter (1955)
  Son Without a Home (1955)
 War of the Maidens (1957)
 The King of Bernina (1957)
 The Saint and Her Fool (1957)
 Es geschah am hellichten Tag (1958)
 The Cheese Factory in the Hamlet (1958)
 The Ideal Woman (1959)
 Old Heidelberg (1959)
 Heaven, Love and Twine (1960)
 Grounds for Divorce (1960)
 Via Mala (1961)
 Kohlhiesel's Daughters (1962)
 Der Unsichtbare (1963)
 Keine Angst Liebling, ich pass schon auf (1970) - Hoteldirektor
 Immer die verflixten Weiber (1971) - Heiri Baer

References

External links

1897 births
1977 deaths
Male actors from Zürich
Swiss male film actors
Swiss male silent film actors
Swiss male television actors
20th-century Swiss male actors